Happy Daze may refer to:

 Happy Daze (Lindisfarne album), a 1974 album by Lindisfarne
 Happy Daze (Battlefield Band album), 2001
 Happy Daze (compilation album), 1990 compilation album of Madchester and associated singles

See also
 Happy Days (disambiguation)